The tenth season of Two and a Half Men premiered on CBS on September 27, 2012, and concluded on May 9, 2013. This season aired on Thursdays at 8:30 p.m., following The Big Bang Theory, in the United States.

Production
On May 12, 2012, CBS renewed Two and a Half Men for a tenth season, following the announcement that CBS had closed a one-year deal with stars Ashton Kutcher, Jon Cryer, and Angus T. Jones. Series co-creator Lee Aronsohn did not return to his position as  showrunner; he was replaced by executive producers Don Reo and Jim Patterson. On September 6, 2012, the other series co-creator Chuck Lorre signed a deal with Warner Bros. Television to remain executive producer of Two and a Half Men. 

Cast members Holland Taylor and Marin Hinkle each made only one brief appearance this season, separately, although their characters were mentioned several times. Taylor had been on Broadway doing a one-woman show about Ann Richards for the majority of the show's season, while Hinkle starred in an NBC drama called Deception, which premiered on January 7, 2013, but the show was canceled on May 7, 2013. Taylor would appear in more episodes in the next season, as confirmed by show runner Jim Patterson. As with Marin Hinkle for the season 9 DVD, the Complete Tenth Season DVD cover dropped Taylor's name and character from the cast list altogether.

Angus T. Jones comments
In a November 2012 interview with a Christian website, Angus T. Jones revealed that he had recently converted to the Seventh-day Adventist Church. He attacked the show as "filth" that contradicts his moral values and said that he was sick of being a part of it. He also asked fans to stop watching the show. Producers explained that Jones was not expected back on the set until 2013, as his character was not scheduled to appear in the final two episodes before the winter hiatus. In response to the controversy, Charlie Sheen issued a public statement claiming that "Jones' outburst isn't an isolated incident but rather a symptom of the toxic environment surrounding the show" and blamed Chuck Lorre for the outburst. The following day, Jones issued a public apology for his remarks, and explained that he "cannot address everything that has been said or right every misstatement or misunderstanding." Holland Taylor also commented on the outburst, defending the show, saying "Our show is not filth," but stopped short of condemning Jones.

Cast

Main

 Ashton Kutcher as Walden Schmidt
 Jon Cryer as Alan Harper

 Angus T. Jones as Jake Harper
 Conchata Ferrell as Berta

Recurring

 Courtney Thorne-Smith as Lyndsey McElroy
 Brooke D'Orsay as Kate
 Sophie Winkleman as Zoey Hyde-Tottingham-Pierce
 Ryan Stiles as Herb Melnick
 Patton Oswalt as Billy Stanhope
 Melanie Lynskey as Rose
 Mimi Rogers as Robin Schmidt
 Judy Greer as Bridget Schmidt

Guest
 Holland Taylor as Evelyn Harper
 Michael Bolton as himself
 Brit Morgan as Jill
 Bre Blair as Rachel
 Miley Cyrus as Missi
 Lindsay Price as Whitney
 Tricia O'Kelley as Shari
 April Bowlby as Kandi 
 Joel Murray as Nick
 Martin Mull as Russell
 Willie Garson as Dr. Steven Staven
 Jaime Pressly as Tammy
 Elizabeth Bogush as Emily
 Elaine Hendrix as Sylvia
 Alicia Coppola as TC Randall
 Marin Hinkle as Judith Harper-Melnick 
 Scott Bakula as Jerry
 Emily Osment as Ashley
 Amanda Detmer as Meghan
 George Coe as Victor
 Hilary Duff as Stacey
 Marilu Henner as Linda

Episodes

Ratings

U.S. Nielsen and DVR ratings

References

General references

External links
 

Season 10
2012 American television seasons
2013 American television seasons